Hadgaon Assembly constituency is one of the 288 Vidhan Sabha (legislative assembly) constituencies of Maharashtra state, western India. This constituency is located in Nanded district.

Geographical Scope
The delimitation of the constituency happened in 2008. It comprises Himayatnagar taluka and Hadgaon taluka.

Representatives
 1952: Madhavrao Patil- Waipankar, SKP
 1957: Anjanabai Patil-Waiphanekar
 1962: Bhimrao Keshavrao, Congress
 1967: B.K.Deshmukh, Congress
 1972: Ganpatrao Palkar, INC
 1978: Niwruttirao Mahadji Pawar (Patil) Jawalgaonkar, Janata Party
 1980: Suryakanta Patil, Congress (I.)
 1985: Bapurao Shivram Patil Shinde Ashtikar, Congress (S.)
 1990: Bapurao Shivram Patil Shinde Ashtikar, Congress
 1995: Subhash Bapurao Wankhede, Shivsena
 1999: Subhash Bapurao Wankhede, Shivsena
 2004: Subhash Bapurao Wankhede, Shivsena
 2009: Madhavrao Nivrutirao Pawar (Patil) Jawalgaonkar, INC
 2014: Nagesh Bapurao Patil Ashtikar, Shiv Sena
 2019: Madhavrao Nivrutirao Pawar (Patil) Jawalgaonkar, INC

References

Assembly constituencies of Maharashtra
Politics of Nanded district